Fuwayrit (also spelled as Fuwairat) is a coastal village in Qatar, located in the municipality of Ash Shamal approximately 90 km north of the capital Doha. It is an important site for Qatar's oil industry. Archaeological evidence suggests that it may have been settled as early as the 16th century. Previously, it was one of the most important towns in the northern sector of Qatar, having served as the seat of power for the Al Thani who had migrated to it during the 18th century, prior to relocating to Al Bidda (presently Doha) in 1847.

Etymology
Fuwayrit is derived from the Arabic word 'farat' (or 'fart'), meaning to advance or to progress. This name was chosen in reference a man who left his tribe in Fuwayrit by boat.

History

18th century
According to family tradition, the Al Thani family migrated from Zubarah, previously Qatar's largest town, to Fuwayrit some time in the late 1700s.

19th century

First British survey

In the 1820s, George Barnes Brucks carried out the first British survey of the Persian Gulf. He recorded the following notes about Fuwayrit, which he referred to as Affeeraat:

1828–1829 conflict
In 1828–1829, a conflict emerged between the inhabitants of Fuwayrit and Doha after natives of Fuwayrit robbed a family with close ties to the Al Thani family. A nephew of Thani bin Mohammed named Khalfan bin Khalfan inherited a large sum of money after his father, a wealthy tawash (pearl trader), died. Khalfan's mother gave Thani the inheritance to invest it on her son's behalf. When Khalfan reached adulthood, Thani distributed the money, which now amounted to a fortune, to Khalfan, and to his own son Mohammed bin Thani. Khalfan would use his share of the wealth to open a business in Fuwayrit. Tensions soon arose between envious Fuwayrit residents and Khalfan, culminating in Khalfan being robbed of all his money.

Having been deprived of his livelihood, he appealed to Abdullah bin Ahmed Al Khalifa, a Bahraini representative stationed in Qatar, but he had little interest in Khalfan's protests because he was preoccupied with the recent death of his brother, Salman. A man named Ali bin Amr Al Attiyah was present during Khalfan's appeal and promised to lend his aid on account of a tribal alliance. They went to Doha where they were successful in receiving volunteers from the Bani Malik, Al Soudan, and Al Suluta tribes. The coalition forces departed from Doha and traveled to Fuwayrit via boat. Upon receiving news of the joint force's impending arrival, the culprits surrendered their illegally-obtained wealth without incident.

Battle of Fuwayrit

The town was frequently visited and its affairs interfered with by the King of Bahrain, Mohammed bin Khalifa, who in 1843 ascended the throne. In 1847, Isa bin Tarif, the chief of Al Bidda, became convinced that Mohammed bin Khalifa wanted to bring the nearby town of Zubarah under his control in order to prevent future attacks on Bahrain from being launched from the coast of Qatar.

The deposed ruler of Bahrain, Abdullah bin Ahmed bin Khalifa, lived in Qatar during this period. After garnering support from the Wahhabis of Najd, he threatened to occupy Bahrain. In addition to having support from the Wahhabis, Isa bin Tarif had also pledged his allegiance to Abdullah bin Ahmed. This prompted Mohammed bin Khalifa to write a letter describing the situation to Captain William Lowe, captain of the East India Company's naval squadron, in November. Captain Lowe responded to the letter by requesting Mohammed bin Khalifa to refrain from hostilities at sea, and warned that any vessels found being used for war would be seized. Mohammed bin Khalifa retorted by blaming Isa bin Tarif and Abdullah bin Ahmed for creating a warlike atmosphere. On 7 November 1847, Isa bin Tarif and his deputy jointly wrote to Samuel Hennell describing their suspicions of Mohammed bin Khalifa's plan to invade the north-east coast of Qatar.

Intent on defending the coast from Bahraini intervention, Isa bin Tarif and Mubarak bin Ahmed preemptively arrived in Fuwayrit with troops in the first week of November. Mohammed bin Khalifa retorted by sending 7 small ships and 20 battils and advancing towards Fuwayrit by way of Zubarah. As the tensions worsened, the British dispatched several naval ships to blockade Al Bidda and wrote warning letters to Isa bin Tarif, Abdullah bin Ahmed and Mohammed bin Khalifa. Shortly after, Mohammed bin Khalifa's military general Ali bin Khalifa landed on the coast of Al Khor with 500 Bahraini troops under his command. The Bahraini forces were accompanied by the governors of al-Hasa and Qatif. The forces of Isa bin Tarif and Mubarak bin Ahmed numbered 600 troops and lacked any sort of cavalry units.

The decisive battle took place on 17 November 1847 near Fuwayrit. Isa bin Tarif's forces were defeated after he and eighty of his men were killed. After proclaiming victory, Mohammed bin Khalifa sent his warships to attack and demolish Al Bidda, and relocated most of its inhabitants to Bahrain. Afterwards, Abdullah bin Ahmed fled to Iran, while his son Mubarak bin Ahmed fled to Najd with 200 supporters. Mohammed bin Khalifa allowed 250 prisoners of war to settle on Kish Island. This was a defining point in Qatar's history, as Isa bin Tarif's death left a gap in the peninsula's leadership which was to be filled by the Al Thani family. Shortly after the battle, between 1848 and 1850, the Al Thani family relocated to Doha. This was proceeded by a landmark treaty signed between Mohammed bin Thani and the British government in 1868, in which Qatar's independence from Bahrain was acknowledged and in which Mohammed bin Thani was to be recognized as ruler of the Qatar Peninsula.

Late 19th century
In November 1879, there was a mass exodus of members of the Bu Kuwara tribe from Doha to Fuwayrit. The cause of the migration was tensions between the tribe and emir Jassim bin Mohammed, and was said to have been instigated by the Bahraini sheikh. In 1881, they were joined by members of the Al Nuaim tribe.

An 1890 British account records Fuwayrit as "A small walled town with several towers, 12 miles northwest of Ras Laffan, standing on a small khor; it has some white sand-hills immediately to the northward of it. The people of these towns are of the Al Bu Kuwara [Kuwari] tribe. At about 4 miles north of this place, a small village with several towers has been established by people from Wakra, and called Al Ghariyah. A small village with several towers, called ar Riyat, now stands about 2 miles north of Fuwairit and just to northward of the sand hills."

20th century

Fuwayrit was described as such in J.G. Lorimer's Gazetteer of the Persian Gulf in the early 20th century:

According to the Origins of Doha Project, which is a UCL-headed project funded by the Qatar National Research Fund, aerial photographs taken of the site indicate that it was abandoned by the mid-20th century. However, a new village called Safya had emerged to the immediate south of Fuwayrit. It is possible that Fuwayrit, like many other settlements in Al Shamal during the mid-1900s, experienced significant population outflow due to upper aquifer salinization resulting from the overuse of diesel-powered water pumps. Nonetheless, once Qatar had begun reaping profits from its oil extraction activities, many northern settlements became repopulated as it had become feasible to transport water over longer distances.

21st century
From January to February 2016, the Origins of Doha Project, being assisted by Qatar Museums, surveyed Fuwayrit and made a comprehensive list of all of its historic buildings which dated back to the 20th century. This was done in order to gain a more thorough understanding of the country's history during this period in lieu of written sources, which are scarce.

Aerial photography indicates that the new settlement of Fuwayrit, called Safya, has expanded considerably in the 21st century, particularly along the coast and towards Al Marroona. Nonetheless, construction outside the settlement boundaries is prohibited to prevent disruption of the area's small but diverse ecosystem.

Geography

Nestled in northeast Qatar, Fuwayrit is located 91 km north of the capital Doha, 25 km away from Ar Ru'ays, 51 km away from Zubarah, 60 km from Al Khor City, and 106 km from Al Wakrah.

The original town was established on a short, tapered headland with a soil texture comprising mainly silty sand. On the coastline to the east, sandspits separated the town from the sea. More inland, a sabkha system has developed and is characterized by grassy rawdas. This sabkha branches out into a narrow channel that marks the northern extremity of the original town, and the beginning of a rocky upland to its immediate north. Since the original town's abandonment in the mid-20th century, the coastal sandspit has grown in size.

The dominant geological formation present in Fuwayrit and in most of north-east Qatar is the Dammam Formation, of which Eocene limestone is the primary component. Near the coast, the Dammam Formation is overlain by the Fuwayrit Formation, which consists of aeolian deposits that form Jebel Fuwayrit. The Al Ghariyah Fault runs parallel to Al Ghariyah and Fuwayrit.

Water availability
Historically, as Fuwayrit is based directly on the coast, seawater prevented direct access to the groundwater. Therefore, the village formed a trade relationship with the nearby settlements of Al `Adhbah, Filiha, and Ain Sinan in which it would receive freshwater in exchange for sea goods. Fuwayrit's residents also visited an area 1.5 km inland called Zarqa, which they used as a source of farmland, freshwater and protection.

A rather large stone wall was built on the western side of ridge of Jebel Fuwayrit. While the purpose of this structure is unknown, it is speculated that it was constructed sometime in the 20th century to help accumulate rain water and surface run-off from the jebel.

Nature
Together with Ras Laffan, Fuwayrit accommodates approximately 30% of all sea turtle nests in Qatar. Fuwayrit Beach is reported as offering the best protection to turtle eggs anywhere in the country, with 14 nests being preserved in 2012. The area's natural geography offers a suitable breeding ground for sea turtles, particularly within its sandspits. During the sea turtle breeding season (late Spring and early Summer), the Ministry of Municipality and Environment (MME) closes the beach to visitors and periodically patrols the area.

Fuwayrit Beach is a popular bird-watching site. The intertidal sandflats and lagoonal mudflats off the coast are important habitats for migratory seabirds. Furthermore, there a number of low nabkhas, reaching a maximum of height of about 5 feet, that host various seabird populations. A short-term survey in 2013 recorded upwards of 53 bird species off the coast.

Significant mangrove communities exist off the coast. In the later 20th and 21st century, the area of mangroves drastically increased, likely resulting from lower grazing pressure once the area became partially abandoned.

Jebel Fuwayrit
Jebel Fuwayrit is a low, rocky hill formed by wind-blown deposits and is believed to date back to the end of the Late Pleistocene period.

Archaeology

Danish archaeologist Hans Kapel recorded at least 100 different rock carvings at Jebel Fuwayrit during his 1983 survey. Cup marks are among the most common type of rock art, with some serving functional purposes such as being used as game boards. Such uses are relatively uncommon elsewhere in the world. Furthermore, some cup marks may have been used for pearl sorting. Boat-like petroglyphs were also observed.

These rock carvings are mainly centered at the highest point of the ridge of Jebel Fuwayrit, which would have offered the best vantage point of incoming pearling vessels. They are also found, albeit less commonly, at the lower portions. It is probable that there are some yet-unrecorded rock carvings that are concealed by the small sand dunes scattered throughout the jebel.

Alongside some of the historic carvings is modern Arabic graffiti that was scrawled during the 20th and 21st centuries.

Tourism
Fuwayrit is known for its beach located on the outskirts of the village.

References

Populated coastal places in Qatar
Populated places in Al Shamal